USS Challenger may refer to:

 , an early-20th century US Navy cargo ship

Fictional vessels
 USS Challenger (NCC-71099), a fictional starship from the Star Trek: Voyager episode "Timeless" (Star Trek: Voyager)

See also
 Challenger was the name of the Lunar Module on Apollo 17